Grover Sellers  (November 20, 1892 – August 27, 1980) was Attorney General of Texas from 1944 to 1946.

Early years
Sellers was born in Louisiana on November 20, 1892. He married his wife Hazel and had two daughters, Clara Lee and Helen.

Career
He was elected a Delegate to the 1928 Democratic National Convention from Texas.

In 1930, Sellers defeated Justice William Hodges in the Democratic Primary and was subsequently elected a Justice of the Sixth Court of Appeals in Texarkana. Reelected in 1936, Sellers resigned his office to become Attorney General of Texas.

He served one term as Attorney General, from 1944–1946. During his term of office, Heman Sweatt, a black man, applied for admission to The University of Texas Law School, which was then segregated for whites only. Sellers opposed Sweatt's admission, citing the "wise and long continued policy of segregation of races in the educational institutions of the state."

Sellers ran for Governor of Texas in the crowded Democratic Primary in 1946. He lost the primary to Beauford H. Jester, coming in fourth.

Later, he was appointed to the 12th Court of Appeals in Tyler. In 1964, Sellers was elected as a Delegate to the 1964 Democratic National Convention.

Local dairy industry leaders
Judge Grover Sellers owned and operated one of the early Jersey Herds in Hopkins County on his farm in the Star Ridge Community. Sellers is considered one of the "moving forces" in bringing the dairy industry to Hopkins County.

Death
Sellers died on August 27, 1980 in Sulphur Springs, Texas.

References

1892 births
1980 deaths
Texas Attorneys General
Texas Democrats
Texas lawyers
People from Hopkins County, Texas
20th-century American politicians
20th-century American lawyers